Demetrius "Sir Jam" Ross is an American writer, record producer, recording engineer and re-mixer, as well as a recording artist. Ross was 'knighted' "Sir Jam" by the New Power Generation.  Ross wrote and performed with Prince, T.C. Ellis, Sheila E., The Pointer Sisters, The Time, Cyndi Lauper, Tom Jones, Philip Bailey of Earth, Wind & Fire, Lonnie Gordon, Klaus Pruenster, Chuckii Booker, Michael Jordan, Tag Team, Jan Pulsford, Bobby Jones Gospel Choir, Chet Atkins, Felicia Collins, Robin Power, Carmen Electra, Candy Dulfer, Donna McElroy, Neal Merrick Blackwood, Rodney Lawson, L.A. Jay, The Legion of Doom, Reggie Rocko, Chill Factor 4, Ghetto Nation, Miroslav Kostadinov and Feminnem.

Ross co-founded Rojam Records with business partner Roland Michael in 1992 in Beverly Hills, California.  The company soon moved to Austria and had success there as a production duo, POF  He started Smash Entertainment with Dino Delvaille, former vice-president of Sony, Urban Music Division and business entrepreneur Thomas Page.

DREAM Learning Center
Ross created a foundation, the DREAM Learning Center, to support music and the arts in public schools and the community.  DREAM is an acronym for Dance-Recording-Entertainment-Art-Music serving children from ages 4 to 18.  Advisory Board Members include Big Jon Platt, Amir Bayyan of Kool & the Gang, Sheila E., Adolfo "Shabba-Doo" Quinones, Pam Baker, Kurtis Blow, Dino Delvaille, Kenneth "Skeeter" Yould, David Lestrick, Juliana Danson, Donnell Smith, Alicia Livingston, Michele Blay, Brandon Williams and Shelli Johnson.  The foundation's goals include harnessing the power of technology to teach children entertainment-related skills.

References

External links

American male musicians
Record producers from Colorado
African-American musicians
Musicians from Denver
Living people
1967 births
21st-century African-American people
20th-century African-American people